By September 2011, there were more than 1,000 amateur roller derby leagues, covering every inhabited continent, with teams in countries such as Canada, Australia, the United Kingdom, New Zealand, Germany, Belgium, Finland, Sweden and Singapore In the UK, the sport is mostly played by women.

Contemporary roller derby has a basic set of rules, with variations reflecting the interests of a governing body's member leagues. The Women's Flat Track Derby Association (WFTDA), which is used by the majority of leagues around the world. For example, members of the United Kingdom Roller Derby Association are required to play by WFTDA rules, while members of the Canadian Women's Roller Derby Association are encouraged to join the WFTDA.

Leagues

England

North East 

 Durham, County Durham – Durham Roller Derby
 Newcastle upon Tyne, Tyne and Wear – Newcastle Roller Derby, Tyne and Fear Roller Derby
 Sunderland, Tyne & Wear – Sunderland Roller Derby
 Teesside – Teesside Skate Invaders

Yorkshire 
 Halifax, West Yorkshire – Halifax Bruising Banditas
 Harrogate, North Yorkshire – Spa Town Roller Derby
 Hull, East Yorkshire – Hull's Angels Roller Derby, City of Hull Roller Derby
 Leeds, West Yorkshire – Leeds Roller Derby, Aire Force One
 Middlesbrough, North Yorkshire – Middlesbrough Roller Derby
 Sheffield, South Yorkshire – Sheffield Steel Roller Derby, The Inhuman League, Hallam Hellcats Roller Derby
 Wakefield, West Yorkshire – Wakey Wheeled Cats
 York, North Yorkshire – York Minxters Roller Derby

North West 
 Barrow-in-Furness, Cumbria – Furness Roller Derby
 Blackpool, Lancashire – Blackpool Roller Derby
 Crewe, Cheshire – Railtown Loco Rollers
 Liverpool, Merseyside – Liverpool Roller Birds
 Manchester, Greater Manchester – Rainy City Roller Derby, Manchester Roller Derby, Arcadia Roller Derby
 Preston, Lancashire – Preston Roller Girls
 Wirral, Merseyside – Riverside Rebels Roller Derby, Wirral Roller Derby

Midlands 
 Birmingham, West Midlands – Crash Test Brummies, Birmingham Roller Derby
 Coventry, West Midlands – Coventry Roller Derby
 Grimsby, Lincolnshire – Grimsby Roller Derby
 Hereford, Herefordshire – Hereford Roller Derby
 Leicester, Leicestershire – Roller Derby Leicester, Dolly Rockit Rollers
 Lincoln, Lincolnshire – Lincolnshire Bombers Roller Derby, Lincolnshire Rolling Thunder
 Mansfield, Nottinghamshire – Mansfield Roller Derby
 Nottingham, Nottinghamshire – Hellfire Harlots, Nottingham Roller Derby, East Midlands Open Roller Derby
 Northampton, Northamptonshire – Vendetta Vixens
 Shrewsbury, Shropshire – Evolution Roller Derby
 Stoke-on-Trent, West Midlands – Stoke City Rollers
 Worcester – Worcester Wyldlings Roller Derby
 Wolverhampton, West Midlands – Wolverhampton Honour Rollers

East 

 Bedford, Bedfordshire – Bedfordshire Roller Derby
 Bury St Edmunds, Suffolk – Suffolk Roller Derby
 Cambridge, Cambridgeshire – Cambridge Rollerbillies
 Norwich, Norfolk – Norfolk Roller Derby
 Peterborough, Cambridgeshire – Borderland Brawlers Roller Derby
 Stevenage, Hertfordshire – Full Metal Roller Derby

South East 

 Brighton, East Sussex – Brighton Rockers Roller Derby
 Chelmsford, Essex – Killa Hurtz Roller Derby
 Eastbourne, East Sussex – Eastbourne Roller Derby
 Herne Bay, Kent – Kent Roller Derby
 High Wycombe, Buckinghamshire – Big Bucks High Rollers
 Oxford, Oxfordshire – Oxford Roller Derby, Oxford Wheels of Gory Roller Derby
 Portsmouth, Hampshire – Portsmouth Roller Wenches 
 Rochester, Kent – Kent Men's Roller Derby, Apex Predators Roller Derby
 Windsor, Berkshire – Royal Windsor Roller Derby

South 

 Basingstoke, Hampshire – Basingstoke Bullets Roller Derby
 Hemel Hempstead, Hertfordshire – Hertfordshire Roller Derby
 London, Greater London – London Rockin' Rollers, London Roller Derby, Southern Discomfort Roller Derby
 Milton Keynes, Buckinghamshire – Rebellion Roller Derby, Milton Keynes Roller Derby
 Southampton, Hampshire – Southampton City Rollers

South West 
 Bath, Somerset – Bath Roller Derby
 Bideford, Devon – North Devon Roller Derby
 Bristol – Bristol Roller Derby
 Devon and Somerset – South  West Angels of Terror (SWAT) Roller Derby
Exeter, Devon – Exeter Roller Derby
 Dorset – Dorset Roller Girls, Dorset Knobs Roller Derby
 Gloucester, Gloucestershire – Severn Roller Torrent
 Guildford – Surrey Roller Girls, Surrey Roller Boys
 Penzance, Cornwall – Cornwall Roller Derby
 Plymouth, Devon – Plymouth City Roller Derby
 Swindon, Wiltshire – Wiltshire Roller Derby

Northern Ireland 
 Belfast – Belfast Roller Derby

Scotland 
 Aberdeen – Granite City Roller Derby, Granite City Brawlers
Dumfries – Doonhame Roller Derby
Dundee – Dundee Roller Derby
 Edinburgh – Auld Reekie Roller Derby, Demonburgh Junior Roller Derby
 Elgin – Helgin Roller Derby
 Glasgow – Glasgow Roller Derby, Mean City Roller Derby, Glasgow Men's Roller Derby 
Grangemouth – Bairn City Rollers
Inverness – Inverness City Roller Derby
Inverclyde – Inverclyde Roller Derby
Livingston – New Town Roller Derby
Lothian – Lothian Derby Dolls, Fear & Lothian
Orkney – Orkney Roller Derby
 Perth – Fair City Rollers
Ullapool – Ullapool Slayers

Wales 
 Abercynon – South Wales Silures, Dare Valley Vixens Roller Derby
 Bridgend – Bridgend Roller Derby
 Cardiff – Cardiff Roller Collective, Tiger Bay Brawlers
Flint – North Wales Roller Derby
 Machynlleth – Mid-Wales Roller Derby
 Neath Port Talbot – NPT Roller Derby
 Newport – Riot City Ravens
 Swansea – Reaper Roller Derby, Swansea City Roller Derby

Defunct Leagues

Northern Ireland 
 Belfast – Belfast City Rockets

See also

 Roller derby

References

 
Roller derby
United Kingdom